Anbara Pesht (also Romanized as ‘Anbarā Pesht; also known as ‘Anbar Posht) is a village in Tula Rud Rural District, in the Central District of Talesh County, Gilan Province, Iran. At the 2006 census, its population was 786, in 178 families.

References 

Populated places in Talesh County